Platoro is an unincorporated community in Conejos County, in the U.S. state of Colorado.

History
A post office called Platoro was established in 1888, and remained in operation until 1919.  Platoro is a name derived from Spanish meaning "silver and gold".

See also
Platoro Dam

References

Unincorporated communities in Conejos County, Colorado
Unincorporated communities in Colorado